The Orthodox Metropolitan Cathedral of São Paulo, also known as the Orthodox Cathedral of São Paulo, is a cathedral of the Greek Orthodox Church of Antioch, located at 1515 Vergueiro in Paraíso, Vila Mariana, São Paulo, Brazil. It was constructed to serve the many Lebanese Brazilians of the Orthodox Christian faith who had been immigrating to Brazil since the late 19th century. It is one of the largest Eastern Orthodox cathedrals in the world, and a fine example of Byzantine Revival architecture.

History
Construction of the cathedral began in 1942, inspired by the Hagia Sophia, and built under the supervision of Paul Taufick Camasmie with the architects Francisca Galvão Bueno and Igor Sresnewsky. Joseph Trabulsi was personally selected by King Farouk of Egypt to participate in its decoration.   worked on the cathedral's marble iconostasis.

References

External links
 

Arab Brazilian
Neo-Byzantine architecture
Cathedrals in São Paulo
Churches completed in 1954
Eastern Orthodox church buildings in Brazil
Greek Orthodox cathedrals
Greek Orthodox Church of Antioch